This is a list of events that occurred during the year 1825 in Brazil.

Incumbents
Monarch – Pedro I

Events
August 29 – The Treaty of Rio de Janeiro between the Kingdom of Portugal and the Empire of Brazil recognized Brazil as an independent nation, formally ending Brazil’s war of independence.
October 12 – The Battle of Sarandí between troops of the Banda Oriental and the Empire of Brazil.

Births

 2 December – Pedro II of Brazil, Emperor of Brazil from 1831 to 1889 (died 1891).
 26 June – Francisco Otaviano

Deaths
 13 January - Frei Caneca

References

 
1820s in Brazil
Years of the 19th century in Brazil
Brazil
Brazil